Tuala Mathew M. Vaea (born 12 September 1966 in Motootua) is a Samoan rugby union retired player who played as a scrum-half. He was the manager of the Manu Samoa at the 2011 Rugby World Cup.

Playing career
His international debut was during a test match against Tonga, at Nuku'alofa, on 28 May 1991. He was part of the 1991 Rugby World Cup roster. In 8 games he scored 25 points - out of 25 points he scored 8 thanks to a try and two penalties in the Western Samoa's victory in the 1991 Rugby World Cup against Wales. His last match was against Scotland, at Murrayfield, on 18 November 1995.

Manager
During the 2011 Rugby World Cup he was the manager of the Samoa national rugby union team, but after the World Cup his home village fined him 100 pigs (about US $ 25.000) for "bad behaviour". as it turned out, Vaea, who had a Tuala title, he did not fulfill his duties as coach during his stay in New Zealand, treating the campaign in New Zealand like a "holiday" and he often drank.
According to the Samoan fans, Samoa did not pass the pool stage, contrary to the expectations after the victory against Australia. Vaea paid the equivalent of a fine of 2000 tala (about £535 or US $840) and apologised to the village elders. In connection with the scandal, the President of the Samoa Rugby Union and Prime Minister Tuilaepa Sailele Malielegaoi demanded to conduct an audit and provide all data on the costs of the Samoan national team during the World Cup. After the dismissal, it was announced that they were looking for a new manager for the national team.
As of March 2018, Vaea has been appointed as CEO of the Samoa Association of Sports and National Olympic Committee.

References

External links
 Mathew Vaea at ESPN Scrum
 Mathew M. Vaea at New Zealand Rugby History

1966 births
Living people
Samoan rugby union coaches
Samoan rugby union players
Rugby union scrum-halves
Samoa international rugby union players
Wanganui rugby union players
Wellington rugby union players
North Harbour rugby union players